1912 in sports describes the year's events in world sport.

American football
College championship
 College football national championship – Harvard Crimson

Association football
Brazil
 Santos FC, officially founded
Colombia
 Deportivo Cali, officially founded
England
 The Football League – Blackburn Rovers 49 points, Everton 46, Newcastle United 44, Bolton Wanderers 43, The Wednesday 41, Aston Villa 41
 20 April: FA Cup final – Barnsley 1–0 West Bromwich Albion at Bramall Lane, Sheffield (replay following 0–0 draw at Crystal Palace)
Germany
 National Championship – Holstein Kiel 1–0 Karlsruher FV at Hamburg-Hoheluft 
Iceland
 Iceland's premier division, now known as Landsbankadeild, is established with KR winning the inaugural title.
Scotland
 Scottish Football League – Rangers
 Scottish Cup – Celtic 2–0 Clyde at Ibrox Park

Athletics
Men's 100 metres
 The first world record in the 100 metres for men is recognised by the International Amateur Athletics Federation, now known as the International Association of Athletics Federations (IAAF), after Donald Lippincott (USA) runs a time of 10.6 at Stockholm.
Men's 1500 metres
 The first world record in the 1500 metres for men is recognised by the IAAF after Abel Kiviat (USA) runs a time of 3:55.8 at Cambridge, Massachusetts.

Australian rules football
AFL Premiership
 Essendon wins the 16th VFL Premiership: Essendon 5.17 (47) d South Melbourne 4.9 (33) at Melbourne Cricket Ground (MCG)

Bandy
Sweden
 Championship final – IFK Uppsala 1–1 Djurgårdens IF (declared a tie; no replay played)

Baseball
World Series
 8–16 October — Boston Red Sox (AL) defeats New York Giants (NL) to win the 1912 World Series by 4 games to 3 with one tie
Events
 20 April — Boston Red Sox open the new Fenway Park with a 7–6 11-inning win over New York Yankees before 27,000.  Minutes later, the Detroit Tigers open the remodelled Navin Park (later named Tiger Stadium) with a 6–5 11-inning win over Cleveland Indians before 24,384.
 Winnipeg Maroons win the Northern League championship

Boxing
Events
 22 February — Johnny Kilbane wins the World Featherweight Championship when he defeats Abe Attell over 20 rounds at Vernon, California.  Attell has held the title since 1903; Kilbane will hold it until 1923.
 28 November — Ad Wolgast loses his World Lightweight Championship to Willie Ritchie following a 16th round foul at Colma, California.  Ritchie holds the title until 1914.
Lineal world champions
 World Heavyweight Championship – Jack Johnson
 World Light Heavyweight Championship – vacant
 World Middleweight Championship – vacant
 World Welterweight Championship – vacant
 World Lightweight Championship – Ad Wolgast → Willie Ritchie
 World Featherweight Championship – Abe Attell → Johnny Kilbane
 World Bantamweight Championship – Johnny Coulon

Canadian football
Grey Cup
 30 November — 4th Grey Cup – Hamilton Alerts 11–4 Toronto Argonauts

Cricket
Events
 A triangular Test tournament is played in England between England, Australia and South Africa.  England wins with Australia second.
England
 County Championship – Yorkshire
 Minor Counties Championship – in abeyance
 Most runs – David Denton 2127 @ 42.54 (HS 221)
 Most wickets – Colin Blythe 178 @ 12.26 (BB 8–36)
 Wisden Cricketers of the Year – no award
Australia
 Sheffield Shield – New South Wales
 Most runs – Wilfred Rhodes 1098 @ 54.90 (HS 179)
 Most wickets – Frank Foster 62 @ 20.19 (BB 7–36)
India
 Bombay Triangular – Parsees
New Zealand
 Plunket Shield – Auckland
South Africa
 Currie Cup – not contested
West Indies
 Inter-Colonial Tournament – Barbados

Cycling
Tour de France
 Odile Defraye (Belgium) wins the 10th Tour de France

Figure skating
World Figure Skating Championships
 World Men's Champion – Fritz Kachler (Austria)
 World Women's Champion – Opika von Méray Horváth (Hungary)
 World Pairs Champions – Phyllis Johnson / James H. Johnson (Great Britain)

Golf
Major tournaments
 British Open – Ted Ray
 US Open – John McDermott
Other tournaments
 British Amateur – John Ball
 US Amateur – Jerome Travers

Horse racing
England
 Grand National – Jerry M
 1,000 Guineas Stakes – Tagalie
 2,000 Guineas Stakes – Sweeper II
 The Derby – Tagalie
 The Oaks – Mirska
 St. Leger Stakes – Tracery
'Australia
 Melbourne Cup – Piastre
Canada
 King's Plate – Heresy
Ireland
 Irish Grand National – Small Polly
 Irish Derby Stakes – Civility
USA
 Kentucky Derby – Worth 
 Preakness Stakes – Colonel Holloway
 Belmont Stakes – not contested due to anti-betting legislation in New York State

Ice hockey
Stanley Cup
 Quebec Bulldogs wins the National Hockey Association (NHA) championship and the Stanley Cup. Quebec then defeats Moncton in a Cup challenge.
Events
 March — Winnipeg Victorias repeats as Allan Cup winners
 March — New Westminster Royals wins the inaugural Pacific Coast Hockey Association (PCHA) championship
 December — Toronto NHA teams, the Blueshirts and Tecumsehs, join the NHA

Motorsport

Olympic Games
1912 Summer Olympics
 The 1912 Summer Olympics takes place in Stockholm
 First usage of electronic timing and public address systems
 Sweden wins the most medals (65) and United States the most gold medals (25)

Rowing
The Boat Race
 1 April — Oxford wins the 69th Oxford and Cambridge Boat Race

Rugby league
England
 Championship – Huddersfield
 Challenge Cup final – Dewsbury 8–5 Oldham at Headingley Rugby Stadium, Leeds 
 Lancashire League Championship – Wigan
 Yorkshire League Championship – Huddersfield
 Lancashire County Cup – Rochdale Hornets 12–5 Oldham 
 Yorkshire County Cup – Huddersfield 22–10 Hull Kingston Rovers
International
 The Ashes are won by Australia as they defeat Great Britain 33–8 in the 3rd Test of the 1911–12 Kangaroo tour of Great Britain at Villa Park before a crowd of 4,000.
Australia
 NSW Premiership – Eastern Suburbs (outright winner)

Rugby union
Five Nations Championship
 30th Five Nations Championship series is shared by England and Ireland

Speed skating
Speed Skating World Championships
 Men's All-round Champion – Oscar Mathisen (Norway)

Tennis
Australia
 Australian Men's Singles Championship – James Cecil Parke (GC) defeats Alfred Beamish (GB) 3–6 6–3 1–6 6–1 7–5
England
 Wimbledon Men's Singles Championship – Anthony Wilding (New Zealand) defeats Arthur Gore (GB) 6–4 6–4 4–6 6–4
 Wimbledon Women's Singles Championship – Ethel Thomson Larcombe (GB) defeats Charlotte Cooper Sterry (GB) 6–3 6–1 
France
 French Men's Singles Championship – Max Decugis (France) defeats André Gobert (France): details unknown
 French Women's Singles Championship – Jeanne Matthey (France) defeats Marie Danet (France): details unknown
USA
 American Men's Singles Championship – Maurice McLoughlin (USA) defeats Wallace Johnson (USA) 3–6 2–6 6–2 6–4 6–2
 American Women's Singles Championship – Mary Browne (USA) defeats Eleonora Sears (USA) 6–4 6–2
Davis Cup
 1912 International Lawn Tennis Challenge –  3–2  at Albert Ground (grass) Melbourne, Australia

References

 
Sports by year